KAIQ (95.5 FM) is a radio station  broadcasting a Regional Mexican format. It is licensed to Wolfforth, Texas, United States, and serves the Lubbock area. The station is owned by Entravision Holdings, LLC.

References

External links

AIQ
Entravision Communications stations
Regional Mexican radio stations in the United States
Mass media in Lubbock, Texas